Tourism in Cyprus occupies a dominant position in the country's economy, and has significantly impacted its culture and multicultural development throughout the years. In 2006, the tourism industry made up 10.7% of the country's GDP and the total employment in the tourism industry was estimated at 113,000 jobs. With a usual minimum of around 4
million tourist arrivals per year, it is the 40th most popular destination in the world and the 6th most popular per capita of local population. Cyprus has been a full member of the World Tourism Organization since 1975.

History
Varosha was once one of the most popular destinations in the world, frequented by Hollywood stars such as Marilyn Monroe, until the Turkish Invasion of Cyprus in 1974. It is now abandoned and the majority of it is guarded by armed troops.

Arrivals by country

 
The majority of tourist arrivals are from elsewhere in Europe. Over 80% of visitors come from Northern, Western, and Eastern Europe, with British tourists remaining the most numerous. Several factors contribute to this, including widely spoken English, as well as the history of British colonialism and the presence of British military bases at Akrotiri and Dhekelia. The downturn in the British economy in the late 2000s was reflected by a drop in tourist arrivals, highlighting the over-reliance of Cyprus' tourist industry on one market. In 2009, efforts were underway to boost arrivals from other countries. In line with contemporary geopolitical developments, Russian tourists became the second largest group in terms of arrivals; this began in the late 2000s and has been rapidly increasing ever since.

The total number of tourists in Cyprus for the 2018 season was 3.93 million. Most visitors arriving on a short-term basis were from the following countries:

Competitiveness
According to the World Economic Forum's 2013 Travel and Tourism Competitiveness Report, Cyprus' tourism industry ranks 29th in the world in terms of overall competitiveness. In terms of Tourism Infrastructure, in relation to the tourism industry Cyprus ranks 1st in the world. With some of the most popular and cleanest beaches in Europe, much of the tourist industry relies on "sea sun and sand" to attract tourists. This reflects in the seasonal distribution of tourist arrivals with a disproportionate number arriving during the summer months. Whereas most eastern resorts like Protaras and Ayia Napa attracts the most of the island tourists during March to November, the west of the island remains open to tourism with the promotion of Cypriot history culture and specialized sports such as golf and climbing has a wider distribution.

Investment
The World Travel and Tourism Council 2016 report on the island outlines that the total investment in the Travel & Tourism industry in 2015 was EUR273.7mn, or 14.0% of the total investments. It projects a rise by 5.3% in 2016 and 2.9% pa over the next ten years to EUR384.6mn in 2026.

Blue Flags
According to the latest KPMG report, Cyprus has the most dense concentration of Blue Flag beaches of which the most at the eastern part, the most Blue Flag beaches per coastline and the most Blue Flags per capita in the world.

Language & service
English is the universal language since the island has an international outlook. Russian is also spoken within the tourist industry. Greek and Turkish remain the main languages spoken by the Greek-Cypriot and Turkish-Cypriot communities respectively.

Personnel & education
In 2012, Eurostat reported that Cyprus is the most educated country in Europe after Ireland since 49.9% of Cyprus's residents have degrees. In 2013, only three other EU Member States invested more public funds in education than Cyprus, as measured by the share of GDP (6.5% compared to a 5.0% EU average).

The Cyprus Tourism Organisation (CTO)
The Cyprus Tourism Organisation, usually abbreviated to CTO, and known as KOT in Greek, was a semi-governmental organisation charged with overseeing the industry practices and promoting the island as a tourism destination abroad. In 2007 the CTO spent a reported €20 million on promotion. In 2019 the CTO was replaced by a government ministry, the Deputy Ministry of Tourism, which took over the assets and responsibilities of the CTO.

See also

Cyprus Museum
Petra tou Romiou
Climate of Cyprus
Cypriot wine
History of Cyprus
Economy of Cyprus
Tombs of the Kings
Tourism in Northern Cyprus

References

External links

 
Cyprus
Beaches of Cyprus
Economy of Cyprus
Cyprus